Greg Rusedski was the defending champion, but lost in the second round to David Witt.

David Wheaton won the title by defeating Todd Woodbridge 6–4, 3–6, 7–6(7–5) in the final.

Seeds

Draw

Finals

Top half

Bottom half

References

External links
 Official results archive (ATP)
 Official results archive (ITF)

1994 Singles